The Pleasure of His Company is a 1961 comedy film starring Fred Astaire and Debbie Reynolds, directed by George Seaton and released by Paramount Pictures.  It is based on the 1958 play of the same name by Samuel A. Taylor and Cornelia Otis Skinner.

Astaire was nominated for a Golden Globe award for his performance.

Plot
San Francisco debutante Jessica Poole hasn't seen her father "Pogo" Poole since the divorce between him and her mother Katharine, many years before. Pogo went off to travel the world and enjoy himself, while Katharine remarried to stodgy banker Jim Dougherty.

Now Jessica is about to marry Roger Henderson, a cattle rancher from the Valley of the Moon in Sonoma County, and Pogo has been invited to the wedding.

Pogo arrives, as charming as he ever was. He is delighted by Jessica, and captivates her in return. He makes peace with Katharine, and even wins over Toy, the Doughertys' prized cook, though not Jim and Roger.

But Pogo is still as irresponsible as before. He invites Jessica to come away with him and "see the world". He even tries to break up her engagement, to Katharine's dismay. He also seems to be coming between Jim and Katharine, who has never quite got over her love for him.

Despite Pogo's maneuvers, the wedding goes through. But Pogo has reserved two airline tickets: who's going with him? Jim, fearing that Pogo has won over Kathrine again, escorts Pogo to the airport with Katharine and her father. Jim, stopping Katharine from buying cigarettes in the airport, fears she is leaving him to meet Pogo at the plane. Jim, Katharine, and her father standing in the waiting room to see Pogo off. Katharine is angered to see that Pogo has taken Jessica's portrait, To which Jim calms her down saying "Let him have it after all the poor guy is alone". Katharines father then points to someone with Pogo, Only for it to be revealed as Toy, much to Jims dismay. Pogo and Katharine share a heartfelt smile and gaze into each other's eyes. Pogo boards a plane – with Toy.

Cast
At the time this film was released, Fred Astaire had given up dancing on screen. He had recently completed a dramatic performance in On the Beach in 1959 and retired from dancing in films because he was getting old. He wouldn't do another Hollywood musical until Finian's Rainbow was released in 1968.  However, he did dance a little in this film during the party sequence, and even sang briefly as he teased Lilli Palmer.  Famed costume designer Edith Head, who designed dresses for the film, appeared early in the film, showing dresses to Debbie Reynolds.

 Fred Astaire as Biddeford "Pogo" Poole
 Debbie Reynolds as Jessica Anne Poole
 Lilli Palmer as Katharine "Kate" Dougherty
 Tab Hunter as Roger Berk Henderson
 Gary Merrill as James "Jim" Dougherty
 Charles Ruggles as Mackenzie Savage
 Harold Fong as Toy
 Elvia Allman as Mrs. Mooney

Original play
Film rights to the play were bought in February 1958 for $350,000 even before the play had been produced. It was bought by the production company of George Seaton and William Perlberg.

The play debuted on Broadway in October 1958. Brooks Atkinson of the New York Times called it "thoroughly delightful".

The play was produced in London where it starred and was directed by Nigel Patrick.

Development
In February 1959 Seaton reportedly wanted Fred Astaire to play the lead alongside Lilli Palmer.

Awards and nominations
 Golden Globes
 Best Motion Picture Actor, Musical or Comedy (Astaire, nominated)
 Berlin Film Festival
 Golden Bear (nominated)

See also
 List of American films of 1961

References

External links 
 
The Pleasure of His Company at the IBDB database

1961 films
1961 comedy films
American comedy films
American films based on plays
Films about weddings
Films directed by George Seaton
Films scored by Alfred Newman
Films set in San Francisco
Films shot in San Francisco
Films with screenplays by Samuel A. Taylor
Paramount Pictures films
1958 plays
American plays adapted into films
Broadway plays
Plays by Samuel A. Taylor
Films produced by William Perlberg
1960s English-language films
1960s American films